United Arabia may refer to:

United Arab Emirates
United Arab Republic
Pan-Arabism